Final straw is an allusion to the proverb "It is the last straw that breaks the camel's back".

It may also refer to:

 Final Straw, a 2003 album by the rock band Snow Patrol
 Final Straw Tour, a concert tour in 2003–2005 by Snow Patrol
 Final Straw: Food, Earth, Happiness, a 2015 film
 The Final Straw (TV series), a 2022 American game show

See also
 Last drop (disambiguation)